Jozef Ignác Bajza (5 March 1755 – 1 December 1836) was an ethnically Slovak writer, satirist and Catholic priest in the Kingdom of Hungary.

He is best known for his novel René mláďenca príhodi a skúsenosťi (original, modern spelling René mládenca príhody a skúsenosti), which was the first novel written in Slovak. He is buried in St. Martin's Cathedral in Bratislava.

Works 
1782
 Rozličných veršuv knižka prvňa (unpublished)
1784
 René mláďenca príhodi a skúsenosťi (first part)
1785
 René mláďenca príhodi a skúsenosťi (second part, unpublished)
1789
 Anti-Fándly (work written against Juraj Fándly)
1789–1796
 Kresťánské katolícké náboženstvo... ďíl 1.–5. (five volumes)
1794
 Slovenské dvojnásobné epigrammata, jednako-konco-hlasné a zvuko-mírne
1794
 Slovenské dvojnásobné epigrammata. Druhá knižka obsahujícá zvuko-mírné
1795
 Veselé účinki, a rečeňí, které k stráveňu trúchľivích hoďín zebral a vidal… (book of anecdotes, satirical and humorous short stories)
1813
 Prikladi ze svatého Písma starího a novího Zákona (second volume issued in 1820)

Works online 
 Anti-Fándly aneb Dúverné Zmlúwánj mezi Theodulusem, tretího Franciskánúw rádu bosákem, a Gurem Fándly, ... W Halle: [s.n.], 1789. 62 p. - available at ULB's Digital Library 
 BAJZA, J. I., FÁNDLY, J., BERNOLÁK, A. Ešče Ňečo o Epigrammatéch, anebožto Málorádkoch M. W. P. Gozefa Bagza nowotného slowenského Epi Grammatistu ... [Pole Eliziské]: [s.n.], [1791]. 15 p. - available at ULB's Digital Library 
 BAJZA, J. I., BERNOLÁK, A. Nečo o epigrammatech, anebožto Malorádkoch Gozefa Ignáca Bagzi, Dolnodubowského Pána Farára, oprawdiwím Slowákom k Uwažováňú predložené ... Žilina: Štefan Prisol, 1794. 36 p. - available at ULB's Digital Library

1755 births
1836 deaths
People from Bytča District
Slovak Roman Catholic priests
18th-century Hungarian male writers
19th-century Hungarian male writers
Burials at St. Martin's Cathedral, Bratislava
19th-century Hungarian novelists
Hungarian male novelists